The Green Hand is a 1940 short film about a young man whose path to juvenile delinquency is rerouted through his participation in the Future Farmers of America. The film was based on the 1932 novel by Paul W. Chapman, an agriculture professor at the University of Georgia. Chapman appeared in the film version, whose cast consisted of students and faculty from the University of Georgia and the surrounding city of Athens, Georgia.

Sears, Roebuck and Company sponsored the production of The Green Hand, which had its theatrical premiere on January 12, 1940, in an Athens, Georgia, event attended by Governor Eurith D. Rivers. The film was released on a non-theatrical basis to support the educational and recruitment efforts of the Future Farmers of America.

See also
 List of films in the public domain in the United States

References

External links
"The Green Hand" at the University of Georgia

1940 films
1940 short films
Sponsored films
Films based on American novels
1940s English-language films
American short films
National FFA Organization
Films shot in Georgia (U.S. state)
University of Georgia